Luis Alexander Rodríguez Polanco (born 2 octubre 1996) is a Dominican footballer who plays as a goalkeeper in Liga Dominicana de Fútbol for Cibao FC and the Dominican Republic.

Early life
From a young age he has emerged as champion in categories Kid, Children, and Junior in Don Bosco School. Played in several major tournaments in La Vega province, winning the championship in different occasions, also winning valuable player. Rodriguez has participated in Primera División de Republica Dominicana teams with representatives Jarabacoa FC and Club Deportivo Domingo Salvio.

Achievements
Cibao FC
Copa Dominicana de Fútbol champion: 2015

References
http://www.cibaofc.com/player/luis-alexander-rodriguez-polanco/

External sources

http://www.cibaofc.com/equipo-cibaofc/

1996 births
Living people
Dominican Republic footballers
Association football goalkeepers
Liga Dominicana de Fútbol players
Cibao FC players
Dominican Republic international footballers